The 1972–73 Idaho State Bengals men's basketball team represented Idaho State University during the  NCAA University Division basketball season. Led by second-year head coach Jim Killingsworth, the Bengals played their home games on campus at the ISU Minidome in Pocatello.

The conference tournament debuted three years later, in 1976.

Senior forward Ev Fopma was named to the all-conference team, and senior guard Edison Hicks was on the second team.

References

External links
Sports Reference – Idaho State Bengals – 1972–73 basketball season

Idaho State Bengals men's basketball seasons
Idaho State
Idaho State